Bagh-e Bala (also Romanized as Bāgh-e Bālā and Bāgh Bālā) is a village in Ramkan Rural District, in the Central District of Qeshm County, Hormozgan Province, Iran. At the 2006 census, its population was 202, in 42 families.

References 

Populated places in Qeshm County